Duane Goodfield (born 17 February 1985 in Beddau, near Llantrisant Wales) is a Welsh rugby union player. A Hooker, he played for Pontypridd RFC and Cardiff Blues and in April 2008 it was announced he would join Newport Gwent Dragons for the new season. He retired at the end of the 2010–11 season after several shoulder surgeries. 2012 – 2014 WRU Rugby Development Officer. 2014 – 2018 Cardiff Blues Academy Coach. 2018 – Cardiff Blues Forwards Coach.

References

External links
Newport Gwent Dragons profile
Cardiff Blues profile
Pontypridd RFC profile

1985 births
Living people
Cardiff Rugby players
Dragons RFC players
Pontypridd RFC players
Rugby union players from Beddau
Welsh rugby union players
Rugby union hookers